The Ambassador of Australia to Morocco is an officer of the Australian Department of Foreign Affairs and Trade and the head of the Embassy of the Commonwealth of Australia to the Kingdom of Morocco. The Ambassador resides in Rabat. The current ambassador since October 2020 is Michael Cutts. From 1976 to 2017, the position was concurrently held by the Australian Ambassador to France, resident in Paris.

Posting history

On 13 July 1976, the Australian Minister for Foreign Affairs, Andrew Peacock, announced the release of a joint statement marking the establishment of diplomatic relations with Morocco as "a mark of the desire of both countries to consolidate and strengthen mutual understanding and to stimulate cultural and commercial links." On 19 January 1977, the serving Australian Ambassador to France, Harold David Anderson, presented his credentials as the non-resident accredited ambassador to King Hassan II of Morocco.

In February 2012, the Australian Parliament Foreign Affairs Sub-committee of the Joint Standing Committee on Foreign Affairs, Defence and Trade undertook an inquiry into the state of Australia's overseas postings. The Ambassador of Morocco to Australia, Mohamed Mael-Ainin, subsequently made a submission to the inquiry arguing for the establishment of an Australian embassy in Morocco, noting: "An Australian embassy in Rabat, like all other great powers, will give an impetus to our ascending bilateral cooperation as well as facilitate Australia’s interests in neighbouring countries, especially French-speaking countries, in Africa."

The Department of Foreign Affairs and Trade also noted to the committee that "an embassy in Morocco would increase Australia’s capacity to engage with a significant player in North Africa, including in the Arab League and the Organisation of Islamic Cooperation." The subsequent report of the committee, entitled Australia’s Overseas Representation – Punching below our weight?, observed in its recommendations that "there is merit in opening an embassy in Morocco to serve the Maghreb and notes that this is in DFAT’s plans for an expanded network should it receive sufficient funds." In November 2016, Foreign Minister Julie Bishop visited Morocco for the 2016 United Nations Climate Change Conference in Marrakech, and announced the opening of an Australian Embassy in Rabat at a joint press conference with Foreign Minister Salaheddine Mezouar.

On 12 May 2017, Foreign Minister Julie Bishop announced the establishment of the Australian Embassy in Rabat and Berenice Owen-Jones as the new ambassador (taking up office in June 2017), noting that this appointment would be "an important addition to Australia’s diplomatic presence in Africa and part of the single largest expansion of our diplomatic network in 40 years." The new Australian Embassy in Rabat upgraded an existing Austrade office in the city.

Ambassadors

See also
Australia–Morocco relations
List of ambassadors of Morocco to Australia

References

External links

Australian Embassy, Morocco

 
Morocco
Australia